Sir Edmund Wyly Grier  DCL (also known as E. Wyly Grier) (November 26, 1862 – December 7, 1957) was an Australian born Canadian portrait painter.

Career
Grier first came to Canada with his parents in 1876 and attended Upper Canada College but when he graduated, he and his parents went back to England so that he could study at the Slade School of Art in London. He studied at the Slade with Alphonse Legros, in Rome at the Scuola Libera del Nudo, and in Paris at the Académie Julian with Adolphe Bouguereau and Tony Robert-Fleury. He exhibited from 1886 to 1895 at the Royal Society of British Artists and at the Royal Academy. In 1890, he won a gold medal at the Paris Salon. In 1891, he returned to Canada to stay, opening a portrait studio in Toronto.

He painted numerous portraits of politicians, corporate leaders and other notable contemporaries, his first commissioned portrait being in 1888 and his last in 1947. Through his portraits, Grier won recognition and admission to the Royal Canadian Academy of Arts in 1894, becoming its president in 1929-1939. In 1901, he won a silver medal at the Pan-American Exhibition at Buffalo. He was active in several arts organizations, including the Ontario Society of Artists (c. 1896) (President, 1908-1913), and was a founding member and second president of the Arts and Letters Club of Toronto.

Grier received an honorary Doctor of Civil Law from the University of Bishop’s College in 1934. In 1935, he was made a Knight Bachelor by the government of Richard Bedford Bennett, the first Canadian to receive a knighthood in recognition of his work as an artist. In 1937 he was elected into the National Academy of Design as an Honorary Corresponding Academician.

His work is in many public institutions including the National Gallery of Canada, the Art Gallery of Ontario and the Robert McLaughlin Gallery.

Gallery

Personal life
From 1897 to 1903, he served with the Royal Canadian Artillery, rising to the rank of major in command of the 9th Field Battery. In 1903, he served as vice-president of the Royal Military Institute.

References

Australian emigrants to Canada
19th-century Canadian painters
Canadian male painters
20th-century Canadian painters
Canadian Knights Bachelor
1862 births
1957 deaths
19th-century Canadian male artists
20th-century Canadian male artists
Alumni of the Slade School of Fine Art
Members of the Royal Canadian Academy of Arts